Allan Mukuka (born 5 August 1987) is a Zambian football (soccer) player who plays as a midfielder. He currently plays for the Green Buffaloes in the Zambian Premier League and the Zambia national football team.

International goals 
Scores and results list Zambia's goal tally first.

References

1987 births
Living people
Zambian footballers
Zambia international footballers
Association football midfielders
Zanaco F.C. players
Mufulira Wanderers F.C. players
Nkana F.C. players
Green Buffaloes F.C. players
People from Mufulira